Frente a Frente Vol. II is a compilation album released by Juan Gabriel and Rocío Dúrcal in 1987. Rocío joins Juan Gabriel in a duet for the second time. The same configuration as Vol. I all Juan Gabriel songs previously available from the 1982 album: Cosas de Enamorados and the 1983 album: Todo

Track listing

References 

1987 compilation albums